Albert Xavier Eluère (8 September 1897 – 5 February 1967) was a French heavyweight professional boxer. He competed in the 1920s and was born in Issé. Eluère won a bronze medal in the 1920 Summer Olympics, losing against Danish boxer Søren Petersen in the semi-finals.

References

External links
 
 Xavier Eluère's profile at Sports Reference.com

1897 births
1967 deaths
Sportspeople from Loire-Atlantique
Heavyweight boxers
Olympic boxers of France
Boxers at the 1920 Summer Olympics
Olympic bronze medalists for France
Place of birth missing
Olympic medalists in boxing
French male boxers
Medalists at the 1920 Summer Olympics